Codex Tchacos is an ancient Egyptian Coptic papyrus, which contains early Christian gnostic texts from approximately 300 AD: the Letter of Peter to Philip, the First Apocalypse of James, the Gospel of Judas, and a fragment of the Book of Allogenes (or the Book of the Stranger; this is different from the previously known Nag Hammadi text Allogenes).

Codex Tchacos is important because it contains the first known surviving copy of the Gospel of Judas, a text that was rejected as heresy by the early Christian church and lost for 1700 years. The Gospel of Judas was mentioned and summarized by the Church Father Irenaeus of Lyons in his work Against Heresies. This would make the Gospel of Judas older than the codex.

The Codex

The codex was rediscovered near El Minya, Egypt, during the 1970s, and stored in a variety of unorthodox ways by various dealers who had little experience with antiquities. One stored it in a safe deposit box and another actually froze the documents, causing a unique and difficult kind of decay that makes the papyrus appear sandblasted.  (Archivists can do nothing to remedy this damage since it is caused by the outer layers of the papyrus flaking off—taking ink with them.)  Scholars heard rumors of the text from the 1980s onward as dealers periodically offered it for sale (displaying portions of the text or photographs of portions of the text in the process.)  It was not examined and translated until 2001 after its current owner, Frieda Nussberger-Tchacos, concerned with its deteriorating condition, transferred it to the Maecenas Foundation for Ancient Art in Basel, Switzerland. She named it in honor of her father, Dimaratos Tchacos.

Roughly a dozen pages of the original manuscript, seen briefly by scholars in the 1970s, are missing from the Codex today; it is believed that they were sold secretly to dealers, but none have come forward.  According to National Geographic's website, fragments purported to be from the codex may also be part of an Ohio antiquities dealer's estate.

In April 2006, a complete translation of the text, with extensive footnotes, was released by the National Geographic Society: The Gospel Of Judas (April 2006). The Society also created a two-hour television documentary, The Gospel of Judas, which aired worldwide on the National Geographic Channel on April 9, 2006.  A special issue of National Geographic magazine was also devoted to the Gospel of Judas.  A critical edition of the Codex Tchacos, including complete, near life-sized color photographs of 26 pages, a revised transcription of the Coptic, and complete translation of the codex was published by National Geographic Society in 2007.  The team also hopes to look at the cartonnage (a sort of paper-mâché used to stiffen the codex's cover) in order to find clues about who made the codex and when/where.  (As a book the Tchacos Codex may be older than the twelve surviving codexes of the Nag Hammadi Library.)

April D. DeConick (the Isla Carroll and Percy E. Turner Professor of Biblical Studies in the Department of Religious Studies at Rice University) has published a book, The Thirteenth Apostle:  What the Gospel of Judas Really Says, questioning both the National Geographic's handling of the Gospel of Judas' publication and the veracity of its translation.  She has argued both that National Geographic denied competent scholars access and that the scholars who were granted access to the Codex Tchacos were not able to go about their work properly due to the constraints put upon them, accusations similar to those leveled at the guardians of the Dead Sea Scrolls.  Most notably, she points out that the first National Geographic translation omitted a "not," reversing the meaning of the text.  In an opinion piece in The New York Times (December 2, 2007), she wrote:

The importance of the Codex Tchacos is not in doubt, but work has only begun in understanding its true influence and origin.

Notes

References
 J. Brankaer and H.-G. Bethge (eds), Codex Tchacos: Texte und Analysen (Berlin, Walter de Gruyter, 2007) (TU, 161).

External links

Frequently Asked Questions, from National Geographic.
The Coptic Ps. Gospel of Judas
April D. DeConick, "Gospel Truth."  The New York Times, December 1, 2007.

4th-century books
4th-century manuscripts
Gnostic apocrypha
Coptic manuscripts
Coptic literature